The TCA Award for Individual Achievement in Comedy is an award given by the Television Critics Association.

Winners and nominees

Multiple wins
2 wins

Louis C.K. (consecutive)
Jane Kaczmarek (consecutive)
David Hyde Pierce (consecutive)
Jon Stewart

Multiple nominees

7 nominations
 Julia Louis-Dreyfus

6 nominations
 Jon Stewart

5 nominations
 Pamela Adlon
 Ray Romano

4 nominations
 Louis C.K.
 Jim Parsons
 Amy Poehler

3 nominations
 Alec Baldwin
 Stephen Colbert
 Tina Fey
 Bill Hader

2 nominations
 Aziz Ansari
 Christina Applegate
 Jason Bateman
 Rachel Bloom
 Ty Burrell
 Steve Carell
 Larry David
 Lena Dunham
 Calista Flockhart
 Donald Glover
 Kelsey Grammer
 Sean Hayes
 David Hyde Pierce
 Jane Kaczmarek
 Megan Mullally
 Nick Offerman
 Catherine O'Hara
 Issa Rae
 Jean Smart
 Jason Sudeikis
 Jeffrey Tambor
 Phoebe Waller-Bridge
 Constance Wu

References

External links
 Official website

Comedy